Adrianus Ambrosius Cornelis van Kraaij (born 1 August 1953 in Eindhoven, North Brabant), commonly known as Adrie van Kraay, is a retired football central defender from the Netherlands.

Career
Van Kraaij represented his native country at the 1978 FIFA World Cup in Argentina, wearing the number four jersey. He played for PSV Eindhoven from 1971 until 1982, making 309 appearances and five scores for his club. At the end of his career, he had short spells at K. Waterschei S.V. Thor Genk of Belgium and FC Basel of Switzerland. From 2008 until 2010, Van Kraay was director of football at PSV Eindhoven, after Stan Valckx left the club.

References

External links 

 
 

1953 births
Dutch footballers
Dutch expatriate footballers
Netherlands international footballers
1978 FIFA World Cup players
UEFA Euro 1976 players
PSV Eindhoven players
K. Waterschei S.V. Thor Genk players
FC Basel players
Footballers from Eindhoven
Eredivisie players
Belgian Pro League players
Living people
Association football defenders
Expatriate footballers in Belgium
Expatriate footballers in Switzerland
Dutch expatriate sportspeople in Belgium
Dutch expatriate sportspeople in Switzerland
UEFA Cup winning players